Paint Branch is a  tributary stream of the Anacostia River that flows Southeastwards through Montgomery County and Prince George's County, Maryland. Specifically, its primary tributary is of the Northeast Branch, which flows to the Anacostia River, Potomac River and the Chesapeake Bay. The beginning elevation of the stream is 480 feet above sea level and it subsequently drops to 30 feet when its flows meet the Indian Creek in College Park, Maryland. 

Watershed characteristics

Physical

The Paint Branch subwatershed is approximately 13,287 acres (20.7 miles) in size and 18% impervious. The areas along Maryland's route 29, the intersection of Sandy Spring Road, and Columbia Pike in Burtonsville, Maryland have undergone extensive commercial development. Contrasting this, counties that border the watershed's southern-flowing direction (Montgomery and Prince George's), offer the least amount of developed areas.

Biological and ecological
The Paint Branch tributary stream is classified according to the state of Maryland’s Department of the Environment as Use I and Use III waters. Specifically, the lower partition of the Paint Branch stream is the Use I section, and the upper partition of the stream is Use III. A Use I stream has water contact recreations and the protection of nontidal warmwater aquatic life. In so many words, this means that leisure occurs in these areas, while the growth of fish and other wildlife is protected. A Use III water expands on this concept, by categorically facilitating the growth and propagation of the trout species. Thus, in the upper parts of the Paint Branch stream, naturally reproducing brown trout are one of the most significant aquatic species in the community.

Tributaries 
Left Fork
Right Fork
Gum Springs Tributary
Good Hope Tributary
Snowden's Mill Branch
Fairland Farms
Columbia Park Tributary
Hollywood Branch
Martin Luther King Tributary
Tanley Road Tributary
Stewart-April Lane Tributary
West Farm Branch
Little Paint Branch
Indian Creek

Recreation

There are two trails along the Paint Branch stream which holistically make up the Paint Branch Trail. One is a 3-mile hard surface trail in Montgomery County that runs from Martin Luther King Jr. Recreational Park to Fairland Road with a trail extension in progress to take the trail to Old Columbia Pike.  The other is part of the Anacostia Tributary Trail System in Prince Georges County and goes from Lake Artemesia to Cherry Hill Road.

See also
List of Maryland rivers

References

External links
Eyes of Paint Branch Community watershed organization
Restoring Paint Branch
Anacostia Riverkeeper
Countywide Stream Protection Strategy: Paint Branch Watershed Montgomery County Dept. of Environmental Protection
Anacostia Watershed Society
Anacostia Watershed Restoration Partnership
Paint Branch Trail Montgomery County Dept. of Parks
Anacostia Tributary Trail System Prince George's County Dept. of Parks & Recreation

Rivers of Montgomery County, Maryland
Rivers of Prince George's County, Maryland
Rivers of Maryland
Anacostia River